Canoeing was an official Olympic sport for the first time at the 1936 Summer Olympics in Berlin.  It had been a demonstration sport twelve years earlier at the 1924 Summer Olympics in Paris.  A total of nine events were contested at the 1936 Games, all in canoe sprint for men. In total, 158 canoeists from 19 nations took part in the canoe races. All these countries had sent in entries before the deadline, the only late entry came from Latvia, which was as a result excluded from participating in the canoeing competitions.

The competitions were held on Friday, August 7, 1936, and Saturday, August 8, 1936. They were held on a regatta course at Grünau on the Langer See.

Medal table

Medal summary

Participating nations
A total of 119 canoers from 19 nations competed at the Berlin Games:

Notes

References
1936 Summer Olympics Official Report Volume 2. pp. 1020–9.
 

 
1936 Summer Olympics events
1936